Leonard Ganley,  (27 April 1943 – 28 August 2011) was a Northern Irish snooker referee. He visited England in 1971 intending to spend a ten-day holiday with his sister in Burton-upon-Trent, and remained in England.

Born in Lurgan, County Armagh, Northern Ireland, he became a full-time referee after working as a milkman and bus driver when he first arrived in Burton-on-Trent. He played snooker when he lived in Northern Ireland and won various local titles in Britain and Ireland. His highest break was 136.

He refereed four World Snooker Championship finals between 1983 and 1993, including 1990 when Stephen Hendry became the youngest World Champion. Another career highlight was the 1983 UK Championship final between Alex Higgins and Steve Davis. Another famous match he refereed in his later career was Ronnie O'Sullivan's fastest 147 against Mick Price in the first round of 1997 World Championship.

Although a non-drinker, Ganley also appeared in a Carling Black Label beer advert on TV in the early 1980s, in which he crushed the cue ball with his gloved hand in a match between Terry Griffiths and John Spencer, after Spencer had knocked the ball off the table and into the groin of Ganley.

Ganley was the subject of the Half Man Half Biscuit tribute song "The Len Ganley Stance". The band referred to him as the 'Godfather of Punk' on the sleeve notes. He retired from refereeing in 1999 and suffered a heart attack in 2002. His son Mike Ganley is the WPBSA Tournament Director.

He was awarded the MBE in 2000 in recognition of his charity work and for services to snooker. Ganley, who suffered from diabetes, died on 28 August 2011, aged 68. His family requested that people donated to the Paul Hunter Foundation rather than sending flowers. Steve Davis said: "Len did a very good job of being a referee and a personality at the same time. A referee is supposed to be unseen and he liked the limelight, but he still managed to do the job properly. He was a great character off the table, but in the arena he was an excellent referee. He knew the game as a player, having made century breaks himself, so when he was in charge of your match it was nice to know how well he understood the game."

References

1943 births
2011 deaths
Members of the Order of the British Empire
People from Lurgan
Snooker referees and officials
Referees and umpires from Northern Ireland